The Săliște (also: Râul Negru and Valea Mare) is a left tributary of the river Cibin in Romania. It discharges into the Cibin in Orlat.

Tributaries
The following rivers are tributaries to the river Săliște:

Left: Luncuța, Mag
Right: Căptanu, Pârâul Peștilor, Greul, Pârâul Muntelui, Valea Drojdiei, Tilișca, Valea Muierii, Sibiel, Orlat

References

Rivers of Romania
Rivers of Sibiu County